Sonny Jay Lewis (born 2 January 2005) is a Welsh footballer who plays as a midfielder for Newport County.

Professional career
Lewis joined the youth academy of Newport County as a Under 11. At the age of 15 he made his debut for Newport County on 8 September 2020 in the starting line up for the 1-0 EFL Trophy defeat to Cheltenham Town. In doing so he became the youngest player to represent Newport County, surpassing the record set by Regan Poole in 2014.

International career
Lewis first represented the Wales U15 in 2019. In August 2021 he was called up to the Wales under 17 team.

References

External links

Newport County Profile

2005 births
Living people
Welsh footballers
Wales youth international footballers
Association football midfielders
Newport County A.F.C. players